Life Beyond the Box: Norman Stanley Fletcher is a BBC Television comedy docudrama, first shown in 2003, that depicts the later life of Norman Stanley Fletcher, the main character in two earlier television series, Porridge and Going Straight.

Synopsis
The film details Norman Stanley Fletcher's life over the 25 years since his release from Slade Prison. The majority of the programme features surviving members of the cast of the original series, in character, and Ronnie Barker appears as Fletcher only in the last few minutes.

The absence of Fletcher's naïve young cellmate Godber, played by Richard Beckinsale who died in 1979, is explained in a scene in which Fletcher's daughter Ingrid receives a phone call from Godber to say that he is stuck in traffic and will not be able to appear in the "documentary".

The film also featured "Whispering" Bob Harris (who was interviewed about a legendary concert by Slade at Slade Prison), and Melvin Bragg (who interviewed 'Genial' Harry Grout in connection with his autobiography).

Cast
Ronnie Barker as Norman Stanley Fletcher
Patricia Brake as Ingrid Godber
Peter Vaughan as 'Genial' Harry Grout
Christopher Biggins as Lukewarm
Ken Jones as Ives
Sam Kelly as 'Bunny' Warren
Tony Osoba as Jim McLaren

External links 
 

BBC television docudramas
2003 television specials